was a province of Japan in the area of Japan that is today Gunma Prefecture. Kōzuke bordered by Echigo, Shinano, Musashi and Shimotsuke Provinces. Under the Engishiki classification system, Kōzuke was ranked as one of the 13 "great countries" (大国) in terms of importance, and one of the 30 "far countries" (遠国) in terms of distance from the capital. The provincial capital is located in what is now the city of Maebashi; however, its exact location remains uncertain. The ichinomiya of the province is located in what is now the city of Tomioka.

History
Later regular sound changes caused Kamitsuke to shift to Kaudzuke, and then to modern Kōzuke.

During the Heian period, from the year 811, Kōzuke (along with Hitachi and Kazusa) was one of the three provinces where an Imperial Prince was designated as nominal ruler. The area was noted for its production of horses. The original capital of the province was located in what is now Maebashi, along with the kokubun-ji and the sōja of the province. The ichinomiya was located in what is now the city of Tomioka.

During the Sengoku period, Kōzuke was contested between the later Hōjō clan, the Takeda and the Uesugi clans. After the establishment of the Tokugawa Shogunate, much of the province was assigned to several feudal domains. The Nakasendō and the Mikuni Kaidō highways passed through the province, and numerous post stations were established.

Following the Meiji restoration, the various domains became prefectures with the abolition of the han system in 1871. These various prefectures merged to form Gunma Prefecture in 1876. The area subsequently prospered with the development of sericulture and silk spinning industries.

Historical districts
 Gunma Prefecture
 Agatsuma District (吾妻郡)
 Gunma District (群馬郡)
 Higashigunma District (東群馬郡) - merged with Minamiseta District to become the 2nd incarnation of Seta District (勢多郡) on April 1, 1896
 Nishigunma District (西群馬郡) - merged with Kataoka District to become the 2nd incarnation of Gunma District (群馬郡) on April 1, 1896
 Kanra District (甘楽郡)
 Kitakanra District (北甘楽郡) - renamed as Kanra District (甘楽郡) on April 1, 1950
 Minamikanra District (南甘楽郡) - merged with Midono and Tago Districts to become Tano District (多野郡) on April 1, 1896
 Kataoka District (片岡郡) - merged with Nishigunma District to become the 2nd incarnation of Gunma District on April 1, 1896
 Kitagunma District (北群馬郡) - split off from Gunma District on October 1, 1949
 Midono District (緑野郡) - merged with Minamikanra and Tago Districts to become Tano District on April 1, 1896
 Nawa District (佐波郡) - merged with Sai District to become Sawa District (佐波郡) on April 1, 1896
 Nitta District (新田郡) - dissolved
 Ōra District (邑楽郡)
 Sai District (佐波郡) - merged with Nawa District to become Sawa District on April 1, 1896
 Seta District (勢多郡)
 Kitaseta District (北勢多郡) - merged into Tone District on April 1, 1896
 Minamiseta District (南勢多郡) - merged with Higashigunma District to become the 2nd incarnation of Seta District on April 1, 1896
 Tago District (多胡郡) - merged with Minamikanra and Midono Districts to become Tano District on April 1, 1896
 Tone District (利根郡) - absorbed Kitaseta District on April 1, 1896
 Usui District (碓氷郡) - dissolved
 Yamada District (山田郡) – dissolved

Bakumatsu period domains

Notes

References
 Nussbaum, Louis-Frédéric and Käthe Roth. (2005).  Japan encyclopedia. Cambridge: Harvard University Press. ; 
 Papinot, Edmond. (1910). Historical and Geographic Dictionary of Japan. Tokyo: Librarie Sansaisha. OCLC 77691250
 Kōzuke on "Edo 300 HTML"

External links 

  Murdoch's map of provinces, 1903

 
Former provinces of Japan
History of Gunma Prefecture
1871 disestablishments in Japan
States and territories disestablished in 1871